Faisal Vawda is a Pakistani politician who was the Federal Minister for Water Resources from 5 October 2018 to 3 March 2021. He has previously been a member of the National Assembly of Pakistan from August 2018 till March 2021. He was elected as a senator after winning in the 2021 Senate Elections on a seat from Sindh and held the seat until he was disqualified for being a dual national on 9 February 2022. He was a member of Pakistan Tehreek-e-Insaf (PTI) from 2010 to 2022, when his membership was terminated by the party.

Political career
Vawda was elected to the National Assembly of Pakistan from the Constituency NA-249 (Karachi West-II) as a candidate of PTI in the 2018 General Elections. He received 35,344 votes and defeated Shahbaz Sharif. Following his successful election, a petition was submitted in the Sindh High Court seeking the disqualification of Vawda for not disclosing the details of his foreign bank accounts and properties in the affidavit submitted to the Election Commission of Pakistan.

On 5 October 2018, he was inducted into the federal cabinet of Prime Minister Imran Khan and was appointed as Federal Minister for Water Resources.

On 3 March 2021, the day of the 2021 Senate Elections, he resigned from his seat as a member of the National Assembly. He became a Senator after winning in the 2021 Senate Elections and held the seat till 9 February 2022 when he was disqualified by the ECP for being a dual national.

His party membership was terminated on 29 October 2022 by PTI chairman Imran Khan.

Assets
As of 2010, Faisal Vawda is owner of Faisal Vawda Group.

In 2016, NAB summoned Vawda for an inquiry pertaining to fraudulent allotment of amenity plots. A notice issued by NAB said that hundreds of amenity plots have been allotted to Faisal Vawda Group, a company owned by Vawda himself.

In 2019, Saudi Pak Leasing Company Limited filed a plea against Vawda and his father for not returning the loan taken for business purposes.

In 2020, the Federal Board of Revenue released its 2018 tax directory for parliamentarians which noted that Vawda did not pay any taxes. He later denied the allegations by posting his tax returns on his Twitter feed.

In early October 2021, Faisal Vawda was named in the Pandora Papers.

Termination 
As a senior member of Pakistan Tahreek-e-Insaf, Vawda did the press conference on 26 October 2022, where he talked about Imran Khan's azadi long march and disclose the Imran and party policy for azadi march. According the PTI, Faisal press conference were against the party policy and he talked with media without noticing the party. As a result Pakistan Tahreek-e-Insaf issued him a show cause notice and need answer for his press talk. On 29 October 2022 the PTI issued a termination letter to Vawda undersigned the chairman of Pakistan Tahreek-e-Insaf Imran Khan as he is failed to respond on party's show cause notice.

References

1973 births
Living people
Pakistani MNAs 2018–2023
Pakistan Tehreek-e-Insaf MNAs
American people of Pakistani descent
People with acquired American citizenship
Pakistani businesspeople
Pakistani people of Gujarati descent
Pakistanis named in the Pandora Papers